Badger's Green is a 1949 British comedy film directed by John Irwin and starring Barbara Murray, Brian Nissen, Garry Marsh and Kynaston Reeves.

It is based on the play Badger's Green by R.C. Sheriff, which had previously been turned into a 1934 film of the same title. It was shot at Highbury Studios and released as a second feature by the Rank Organisation, on the same bill as Eureka Stockade. The film's sets were designed by Don Russell.

Synopsis
A company plans a massive development in the quiet village of Badger's Green, angering the existing inhabitants. It is eventually agreed that the outcome of the dispute will be settled by a local cricket match.

Main cast
 Barbara Murray as Jane Morton
 Brian Nissen as Dickie Wetherby
 Garry Marsh as Major Forrester
 Kynaston Reeves as Doctor Wetherby
 Laurence Naismith as Mr Butler
 Mary Merrall as Mrs Wetherby
 Clifford Buckton as Sergeant Foster
 Stuart Latham as PC Percy
 Lionel Murton as Albert
 Jack McNaughton as Mr Twigg
 Norman Pierce as Sam Rogers
 Ethel Ramsey as Mrs Rogers
 Patrick Troughton as Jim Carter
 Sam Kydd as Harry Parker

References

Bibliography
 Chibnall, Steve & McFarlane, Brian. The British 'B' Film. Palgrave MacMillan, 2009.

External links

1949 films
British films based on plays
1940s sports comedy films
British sports comedy films
Films set in England
Films shot at Highbury Studios
Cricket films
British black-and-white films
1949 comedy films
1940s English-language films
1940s British films